Inguna or Ingūna is a Latvian feminine given name. The name day of persons named Inguna is June 26.

Notable people named Inguna include:
 Ingūna Butāne (born 1986), Latvian model sometimes simply known as Inguna
 Ingūna Erneste (born 1966), Latvian chess Woman Grandmaster
 Inguna Sudraba (born 1964), Latvian politician

References 

Latvian feminine given names
Feminine given names